The 2014 NCAA Division I FBS football season was the highest level of college football competition in the United States organized by the National Collegiate Athletic Association (NCAA).

The regular season began on August 27, 2014 and ended on December 13, 2014. The postseason concluded on January 12, 2015 with the inaugural College Football Playoff National Championship game at AT&T Stadium in Arlington, Texas.

The 2014 season marked a major change to the postseason with the introduction of the College Football Playoff, a four-team knockout tournament to determine the national champion of Division I FBS. The College Football Playoff system replaced the Bowl Championship Series, which had been in use since 1998.

Ohio State beat Oregon to claim the first ever FBS (formerly Division I-A) national title awarded using a playoff system. Following the game, Ohio State was named the No. 1 team in the AP Poll and Coaches' Poll for the season, making the Buckeyes consensus national champions among the major polls.

Rule changes
The following rule changes have been made by the NCAA Football Rules Committee for the 2014 season:
 Modifying the "targeting" rule enacted for the 2013 season whereby if a targeting ejection is overturned on review, the 15 yard penalty will be overturned as well, unless the foul was committed in conjunction with another foul (such as an above-the-shoulders hit on a quarterback not deemed as targeting, a roughing the passer penalty would still apply).
Targeting definition expanded from "Initiate contact" to "Make forcible contact" and defining that any forcible contact with the crown of the helmet to an opponent is a targeting foul.
 Allowing all conferences the option to experiment with eight-man officiating crews. The Big 12 Conference experimented with eight-man officiating crews during the 2013 season. The eighth official is referred to as the "Center Judge", positioned opposite the Referee in the offensive backfield, and wears a "C" on the shirt. In 2014, the Atlantic Coast Conference, Big Ten Conference, Big 12 Conference, the Mountain West Conference, and the American Athletic Conference used eight-official crews. The Southeastern Conference experimented with eight officials in selected games in the 2014 season. The Pac-12 Conference made no plans to implement eight-official crews. The eight-man crews were used in bowl games (including the 2015 College Football Playoff National Championship) if one of the conferences (Big 12, Big Ten, ACC, MW, or American) provided a crew for a particular game.
 Modifying the 15-yard Roughing the Passer penalty to include hits (including lunging and/or rolling) at or below the knees from defenders that are not fouled/blocked into the quarterback, not engaged in tackling the quarterback, or are rushing unabated to the quarterback (similar to the NFL's "Tom Brady" Rule adopted in the 2009 NFL Season).
The chain crew will work the first half  on the same side as the press box, then switch to the side opposite the press box for the second half, the procedure used in the NFL. Prior to 2014, the chain crew worked the entire game on the sideline opposite the press box, the procedure used in high school football.

A rule meant to slow down the hurry-up offense by preventing teams from snapping the ball within the first ten seconds of the 40-second play clock to allow for defensive substitutions, or be penalized five yards for delay of game (except within the final 2:00 of each half or when the play clock is set to 25 seconds) was tabled by the Rules Committee and not voted on.

Conference realignment

Membership changes
Appalachian State, Georgia Southern and Old Dominion moved from the Football Championship Subdivision (FCS) to FBS. 2014 was expected to be the final season for UAB football, who dropped their program at the conclusion of the season due to financial reasons. The UAB football program later restarted in 2017.

Other headlines
 May 14
 The NCAA announced its Academic Progress Rate (APR) sanctions for the 2014–15 school year. Two FBS teams, Idaho and UNLV, were among the 36 programs in 11 sports declared ineligible for postseason play due to failure to meet the required APR benchmark.
 Boise State announced that it had received a waiver from the NCAA allowing the school to immediately provide assistance to incoming freshman recruit Antoine Turner, a defensive end originally from New Orleans who had been homeless due to financial and family issues.
 June 26 – UNLV announced that the school would be eligible for postseason after the upcoming season; they stated that the NCAA had accepted an updated Academic Progress Rate score submitted by the university.
September 8 – The NCAA restored Penn State's postseason eligibility effective immediately, and full complement of 85 scholarships effective with the 2015 season. This means Penn State could qualify for a bowl game for the 2014 season. Penn State was originally banned from postseason play from 2012 to 2015 because of the Jerry Sandusky child abuse scandal.
 October 4
 For the first time since Week 11 of the 1990 season, four teams ranked in the top six of the AP Poll lost during the week. Additionally, five of the top eight of the AP Poll lost in the same week for the first time ever. The week's upsets began on Thursday, when No. 2 Oregon lost 31–24 at home to Arizona. Saturday saw No. 3 Alabama lose 23–17 at No. 11 Ole Miss, No. 4 Oklahoma lose 37–33 at No. 25 TCU, No. 6 Texas A&M lose 48–31 at No. 12 Mississippi State, and No. 8 UCLA lose 30–28 at home to Utah.
 Washington State quarterback Connor Halliday set a new FBS record for single-game passing yards, throwing for 734 yards in a 60–59 loss to Cal. This broke the previous record of 716, set in 1990 by Houston's David Klingler, and was five short of the all-divisions NCAA record of 739 set by Sam Durley of Division III Eureka in 2012. In the same game, Cal's Jared Goff threw for 527 yards, giving the two teams an FBS-record 1,261 passing yards in the game.
 October 12 – The release of the Week 8 AP Poll saw Mississippi State, previously tied for No. 3 with cross-state rival Ole Miss, leapfrog Florida State to reach No. 1 for the first time in school history. Mississippi State had just beaten No. 2 Auburn at home by a score of 38–23, the Bulldogs' third straight over a team then ranked in the top 10. Most significantly, the Bulldogs became the first team in the history of the AP Poll to go from unranked to No. 1 in five weeks, surpassing the previous record of six weeks set by Ohio State in 1954.
 October 18  – Marshall quarterback Rakeem Cato threw for four touchdowns in the Thundering Herd's 45–13 win at FIU, giving him a touchdown pass in 39 consecutive games. This broke a tie for the FBS record with Russell Wilson, who threw for TDs in 38 consecutive games while at NC State and Wisconsin. Cato went on to finish the season and his Marshall career in the Boca Raton Bowl with a streak of 46 games, tying the all-divisions NCAA record of Central Washington's Mike Reilly.
 November 16 – Wisconsin running back Melvin Gordon set a new FBS record with 408 rushing yards in the Badgers' 59–24 win over Nebraska. The previous record of 406 yards had been set by TCU's LaDainian Tomlinson in 1999.
 November 22  – Melvin Gordon's single-game FBS rushing record, which had been set less than a week earlier, is broken by Oklahoma's Samaje Perine, who ran for 427 yards in the Sooners' 44–7 win over Kansas.
 November 29 – Louisville safety Gerod Holliman intercepted his 14th pass of the season, tying the single-season FBS record set in 1968 by Washington's Al Worley. The interception in the final minute sealed the Cardinals' 44–40 win over archrival Kentucky.
 November 30 – Police in Columbus, Ohio discovered the body of Kosta Karageorge, a wrestler at Ohio State who had walked on to the football team but had yet to appear in a game. Karageorge, who disappeared on November 26, was found with an apparently self-inflicted gunshot wound. He had been complaining about post-concussion symptoms in the last weeks of his life.
 December 2 – UAB announced that it would drop football at the end of the season. The Blazers, under first-year head coach Bill Clark, became bowl-eligible for only the second time in program history with a win on November 29 over Southern Miss. UAB became the first FBS-level program to fold since Pacific dropped football after the 1995 season. (The Blazers would ultimately reinstate football in 2017.)
 December 5 – The board of governors of Colorado State approved the construction of a new on-campus stadium to replace the Rams' then-current off-campus home of Hughes Stadium. No date for completion had been set; potential capacities ranged from 35,872 to 41,200. The venue would open in 2017 as Colorado State Stadium with the full 41,200 capacity, and since 2018 has been known as Canvas Stadium.
 December 8 – Sporting News reported that the Big 12 Conference had been planning to expand beyond its current ten teams even before being left out of the inaugural College Football Playoff. Specifically, conference officials met with officials from the University of Cincinnati. These expansion plans were later dropped.

Updated stadiums

New stadiums 

Baylor opened McLane Stadium, returning home games to its campus for the first time since 1935. The stadium opened with 42,000 permanent seats plus 3,000 standing-room places, and is designed for future expansion to 55,000. The first game was a high school contest on August 29; Baylor's first game was a 45–0 win over SMU on August 31.
Houston opened TDECU Stadium, a 40,000-seat venue, designed to be easily expandable to 60,000, and built on the site of the school's former Robertson Stadium. The opening game was a 27–7 loss to UTSA on August 29.
Tulane opened Yulman Stadium, a 30,000-seat on-campus venue located near the former site of Tulane Stadium. This returned home games to the Tulane campus for the first time since 1974, the year before the Superdome opened. The first game was a 38–21 loss to Georgia Tech on September 6.

The three schools that moved from FCS to FBS this season use existing on-campus stadiums:
Appalachian State plays at Kidd Brewer Stadium, home to the Mountaineers since 1962 and affectionately known to the school's fans as "The Rock". It has an official capacity of 24,050, but has frequently hosted significantly larger crowds, with the record being 31,531.
Georgia Southern plays at Paulson Stadium, home to the Eagles since 1984. The stadium was expanded to 24,300 for GSU's move to FBS.
Old Dominion plays at Foreman Field. The 20,118-seat stadium first opened in 1936 for the football program of what was then known as the Norfolk Division of The College of William & Mary. After football was dropped after the 1941 season, the stadium was used for other football games (notably the former Oyster Bowl), plus other ODU sports, until the school reinstated football in 2009.

Renovated stadiums 

LSU opened a new south end-zone upper deck expansion of Tiger Stadium that added approximately 60 "Tiger Den" suites, 3,000 club seats and 1,500 general public seats and brought the total capacity to approximately 102,321, making it the seventh-largest college football stadium in the country.
Ohio State added 2,500 seats to the south stands of Ohio Stadium. These seats, built over the entrance tunnels, raised the official capacity of the stadium to 104,851, making it the third-largest stadium in the country and the fifth-largest stadium in the world.
Texas A&M opened Phase 1 of a major three-year renovation of Kyle Field, which includes re-construction of the east side first deck, and construction of the south end zone, which in turn includes seating, media interview areas, 12th Man Productions and related gameday support, a commissary and recruiting area.
Mississippi State opened a new north end-zone expansion of Davis Wade Stadium which took stadium capacity from 55,000 to over 61,000. The renovation created new concessions and restrooms, plus a new west side concourse.
Missouri opened a new east side expansion of Faurot Field. An upper bowl was completed for the east side of the stadium, providing 5,200 general admission seats and 800 club seats. 
Louisiana-Lafayette enclosed the south side of Cajun Field. The stadium upgrade added 5,900 seats increasing the capacity from 31,000 to 36,900.
Purdue removed the majority of their south end-zone bleachers at Ross–Ade Stadium and replaced it with a patio area. This stadium upgrade lowered the stadium capacity from 62,500 to 57,236.
 The Rose Bowl opened the final phase of its multi-year renovation project, which included the removal of seats on the east and west sidelines to restore the original oval shape of the seating bowl. Also included in the project were additional new restrooms, new entry gate structures, and additional new concession stands. The historic hedges surrounding the field were restored to create a new "Rose Garden Walkway". An iconic plaza opened outside of Gate A in front of the south main entrance to the stadium, featuring a large logo of the Pasadena Tournament of Roses.

Other 

 Eastern Michigan installed a gray FieldTurf playing surface at Rynearson Stadium. The stadium is only the second FBS venue with a non-traditional field color, after Albertsons Stadium at Boise State, and the sixth college stadium overall with this feature.

Regular season top 10 matchups
Rankings reflect the AP Poll. Rankings for Week 9 and beyond will list College Football Playoff Rankings first and AP Poll second. Teams that fail to be a top 10 team for one poll or the other will be noted.

Week 2
No. 3 Oregon defeated No. 7 Michigan State 46–27 (Autzen Stadium, Eugene, Oregon)
Week 7
No. 5 Baylor defeated No. 9 TCU 61–58 (McLane Stadium, Waco, Texas)
No. 3 Mississippi State defeated No. 2 Auburn 38–23 (Davis Wade Stadium, Starkville, Mississippi)
Week 8
No. 2 Florida State defeated No. 5 Notre Dame 31–27 (Doak Campbell Stadium, Tallahassee, Florida)
Week 10
 No. 3/4 Auburn defeated No. 4/7 Ole Miss 35–31 (Vaught-Hemingway Stadium, Oxford, Mississippi)
Week 11
No. 9/11 Arizona State defeated No. 10/8 Notre Dame 55–31 (Sun Devil Stadium, Tempe, Arizona)
No. 6/6 TCU defeated No. 7/9 Kansas State 41–20 (Amon G. Carter Stadium, Fort Worth, Texas)
Week 12
No. 5/4 Alabama defeated No. 1/1 Mississippi State 25–20 (Davis Wade Stadium, Starkville, Mississippi)
Week 15
No. 2/3 Oregon defeated No. 7/8 Arizona 51–13 (Pac-12 Championship Game, Levi's Stadium, Santa Clara, California)
No. 6/5 Baylor defeated No. 9/9 Kansas State 38–27 (McLane Stadium, Waco, Texas)

Conference standings

Conference summaries
Rankings reflect the Week 15 AP Poll before the conference championship games were played.

Power 5 Conferences

Group of Five Conferences
Note: Records are regular-season only, and do not include playoff games.

CFP College Football Playoff participant

* On July 22, 2016, Georgia Southern announced that it had been ordered by the NCAA to vacate two wins from the 2013 season and one win from the 2014 season as punishment for fielding academically ineligible student athletes during those games. The ruling does not affect Georgia Southern's 2014 Sun Belt Conference Football Championship.

Postseason

Bowl selections

Starting with the 2014–15 postseason, six College Football Playoff (CFP) bowl games host two semifinal playoff games on a rotating basis. For the 2014-15 season, the Rose Bowl and the Sugar Bowl hosted the semifinal games, with the winners advancing to the 2015 College Football Playoff National Championship at AT&T Stadium in Arlington, Texas.

Bowl-eligible teams
 American (6): Cincinnati, East Carolina, Houston, Memphis, Temple, UCF
 ACC (11): Boston College, Clemson, Duke, Florida State, Georgia Tech, Louisville, Miami (FL), NC State, North Carolina, Pittsburgh, Virginia Tech
 Big 12 (7): Baylor, Kansas State, Oklahoma, Oklahoma State, TCU, Texas, West Virginia
 Big Ten (10): Illinois, Iowa, Maryland, Michigan State, Minnesota, Nebraska, Ohio State, Penn State, Rutgers, Wisconsin
 Conference USA (7): Louisiana Tech, Marshall, Middle Tennessee State, Rice, UAB, UTEP, Western Kentucky 
 Independents (3): BYU, Navy, Notre Dame
 MAC (6):  Bowling Green, Central Michigan, Northern Illinois, Ohio, Toledo, Western Michigan
 Mountain West (7): Air Force, Boise State, Colorado State, Fresno State, Nevada, San Diego State, Utah State
 Pac-12 (8): Arizona, Arizona State, Oregon, Stanford, UCLA, USC, Utah, Washington
 SEC (12):  Alabama, Arkansas, Auburn, Florida, Georgia, LSU, Mississippi State, Missouri, Ole Miss, South Carolina, Tennessee, Texas A&M
 Sun Belt (4): Arkansas State, Louisiana–Lafayette, South Alabama, Texas State

Number of bowl berths available: 76 
Number of bowl-eligible teams: 81

Bowl-eligible teams that were not invited
Ohio, Texas State, Temple, UAB, Middle Tennessee

Bowl-ineligible teams
 American (5): Connecticut, SMU, Tulane, Tulsa, USF
 ACC (3):  Syracuse, Virginia, Wake Forest
 Big Ten (4): Indiana, Michigan, Northwestern, Purdue
 Big 12 (3): Iowa State, Kansas, Texas Tech
 Conference USA (6):  FIU, Florida Atlantic, North Texas, Old Dominion†, Southern Miss, UTSA 
 Independents (1): Army
 MAC (7): Akron, Ball State, Buffalo, Eastern Michigan, Kent State, Massachusetts, Miami (OH)
 Mountain West (5): Hawai'i, New Mexico, San Jose State, UNLV, Wyoming
 Pac 12 (4): California, Colorado, Oregon State, Washington State
 SEC (2): Kentucky, Vanderbilt
 Sun Belt (7): Appalachian State†, Georgia Southern†, Georgia State, Idaho‡, Louisiana–Monroe, New Mexico State, Troy

Number of bowl-ineligible teams: 47

† – Appalachian State (7–5), Georgia Southern (9–3, Sun Belt champions), and Old Dominion (6–6) were conditionally eligible based on win–loss record. However, under FCS-to-FBS transition rules, they are not eligible because enough teams qualified under normal circumstances.

‡ – Idaho was ineligible for postseason play due to an insufficient Academic Progress Rate. However, the Vandals would not have been eligible without the ban, as they finished with a 1-10 record.

College Football Playoff

Conference performance in bowl games

Rankings

Final CFP rankings

Final rankings

Unlike the BCS, the Coaches' Poll is not contractually obligated to name the CFP champion as its No. 1 team.

Awards and honors

Heisman Trophy
The Heisman Trophy is given to the year's most outstanding player.

Other overall
Archie Griffin Award (MVP): Ezekiel Elliott, Ohio State
AP Player of the Year: Marcus Mariota, Oregon
Chic Harley Award (Player of the Year): Marcus Mariota, Oregon
Maxwell Award (top player): Marcus Mariota, Oregon
SN Player of the Year: Marcus Mariota, Oregon
Walter Camp Award (top player): Marcus Mariota, Oregon

Special overall
Burlsworth Trophy (top player who began as walk-on): Justin Hardy, East Carolina
Paul Hornung Award (most versatile player): Shaq Thompson, Washington
Campbell Trophy ("academic Heisman"): David Helton, Duke
Wuerffel Trophy (humanitarian-athlete): Deterrian Shackelford, Ole Miss

Offense
Quarterback

Davey O'Brien Award (quarterback): Marcus Mariota, Oregon 
Johnny Unitas Award (senior/4th year quarterback): Marcus Mariota, Oregon
Kellen Moore Award (quarterback): Trevone Boykin, TCU
Manning Award (quarterback): Marcus Mariota, Oregon
Sammy Baugh Trophy (passing quarterback): Brandon Doughty, Western Kentucky

Running back

Doak Walker Award (running back): Melvin Gordon, Wisconsin
Jim Brown Trophy (running back): Melvin Gordon, Wisconsin

Wide receiver

Fred Biletnikoff Award (wide receiver): Amari Cooper, Alabama
 Paul Warfield Trophy (wide receiver): Amari Cooper, Alabama

Tight end

John Mackey Award (tight end): Nick O'Leary, Florida State
Ozzie Newsome Award (tight end): Nick O'Leary, Florida State

Lineman

Dave Rimington Trophy (center): Reese Dismukes, Auburn
Outland Trophy (interior lineman): Brandon Scherff, Iowa
Jim Parker Trophy (offensive lineman): Reese Dismukes, Auburn

Defense
Bronko Nagurski Trophy (defensive player): Scooby Wright, Arizona
Chuck Bednarik Award (defensive player): Scooby Wright, Arizona
Lott Trophy (defensive impact): Eric Kendricks, UCLA

Defensive line

Bill Willis Award (defensive lineman): Joey Bosa, Ohio State
Dick Butkus Award (linebacker): Eric Kendricks, UCLA
Jack Lambert Trophy (linebacker): Scooby Wright, Arizona
Lombardi Award (defensive lineman/linebacker): Scooby Wright, Arizona 
Ted Hendricks Award (defensive end): Nate Orchard, Utah

Defensive back

Jim Thorpe Award (defensive back): Gerod Holliman, Louisville
Jack Tatum Trophy (defensive back): Gerod Holliman, Louisville

Special teams
Lou Groza Award (placekicker): Brad Craddock, Maryland
Vlade Award (placekicker): Roberto Aguayo, FSU
Ray Guy Award (punter): Tom Hackett, Utah
Jet Award (return specialist): Tyler Lockett, Kansas State

Coaches
AFCA Coach of the Year: Gary Patterson, TCU
AP Coach of the Year: Gary Patterson, TCU
Bobby Bowden National Collegiate Coach of the Year Award: Gary Patterson, TCU
Bobby Dodd Coach of the Year Award: Nick Saban, Alabama
Eddie Robinson Coach of the Year: Gary Patterson, TCU
 Maxwell Coach of the Year: Dan Mullen, Mississippi State
Paul "Bear" Bryant Award: Gary Patterson, TCU
Liberty Mutual Coach of the Year Award:
SN Coach of the Year: Gary Patterson, TCU
The Home Depot Coach of the Year Award: Gary Patterson, TCU
Woody Hayes Trophy: Gary Patterson, TCU
Walter Camp Coach of the Year: Gary Patterson, TCU

Assistants
AFCA Assistant Coach of the Year: Gary Campbell, Oregon 
Broyles Award: Tom Herman, Ohio State

All-Americans

Coaching changes
This is restricted to coaching changes taking place on or after May 1, 2014. For coaching changes that occurred earlier in 2014, see 2013 NCAA Division I FBS end-of-season coaching changes.

Television viewers and ratings

Most watched regular season games
Excludes Kickoff Games

Kickoff games

Conference championship games

College Football Playoff

^Does not include viewers from ESPN Megacast which also included channels ESPN2, ESPNU, ESPNews, ESPN Classic, and ESPN Deportes. 34.1 Million viewers for all channels combined.

See also

 2014 NCAA Division I FBS football rankings

References

External links